The Institution of Civil Engineers (ICE) is an independent professional association for civil engineers and a charitable body in the United Kingdom. Based in London, ICE has over 92,000 members, of whom three-quarters are located in the UK, while the rest are located in more than 150 other countries. The ICE aims to support the civil engineering profession by offering professional qualification, promoting education, maintaining professional ethics, and liaising with industry, academia and government. Under its commercial arm, it delivers training, recruitment, publishing and contract services. As a professional body, ICE aims to support and promote professional learning (both to students and existing practitioners), managing professional ethics and safeguarding the status of engineers, and representing the interests of the profession in dealings with government, etc. It sets standards for membership of the body; works with industry and academia to progress engineering standards and advises on education and training curricula.

History

The late 18th century and early 19th century saw the founding of many learned societies and professional bodies (for example, the Royal Society and the Law Society). Groups calling themselves civil engineers had been meeting for some years from the late 18th century, notably the Society of Civil Engineers formed in 1771 by John Smeaton (renamed the Smeatonian Society after his death). At that time, formal engineering in Britain was limited to the military engineers of the Corps of Royal Engineers, and in the spirit of self-help prevalent at the time and to provide a focus for the fledgling 'civilian engineers', the Institution of Civil Engineers was founded as the world's first professional engineering body.

The initiative to found the Institution was taken in 1818 by eight young engineers, Henry Robinson Palmer (23), William Maudslay (23), Thomas Maudslay (26), James Jones (28), Charles Collinge (26), John Lethbridge, James Ashwell (19) and Joshua Field (32), who held an inaugural meeting on 2 January 1818, at the Kendal Coffee House in Fleet Street. The institution made little headway until a key step was taken – the appointment of Thomas Telford as the first President of the body. Greatly respected within the profession and blessed with numerous contacts across the industry and in government circles, he was instrumental in drumming up membership and getting a Royal Charter for ICE in 1828. This official recognition helped establish ICE as the pre-eminent organisation for engineers of all disciplines.

Early definitions of a Civil Engineer can be found in the discussions held on 2 January 1818 and in the application for Royal Chartership. In 1818 Palmer said that: 

The objects of such institution, as recited in the charter, and reported in The Times, were

After Telford's death in 1834, the organisation moved into premises in Great George Street in the heart of Westminster in 1839, and began to publish learned papers on engineering topics. Its members, notably William Cubitt, were also prominent in the organisation of the Great Exhibition of 1851.

For 29 years ICE provided the forum for engineers practising in all the disciplines recognised today. Mechanical engineer and tool-maker Henry Maudslay was an early member and Joseph Whitworth presented one of the earliest papers – it was not until 1847 that the Institution of Mechanical Engineers was established (with George Stephenson as its first President).

By the end of the 19th century, ICE had introduced examinations for professional engineering qualifications to help ensure and maintain high standards among its members – a role it continues today.

The ICE's Great George Street headquarters, designed by James Miller, was built by John Mowlem & Co and completed in 1911.

Membership and professional qualification
The institution is a membership organisation comprising 92,829 members worldwide (as of 31 December 2020); around three-quarters are located in the United Kingdom. Membership grades include:
 Student
 Graduate (GMICE)
 Associate (AMICE)
 Technician (MICE)
 Member (MICE)
 Fellow (FICE)

ICE is a licensed body of the Engineering Council and can award the Chartered Engineer (CEng), Incorporated Engineer (IEng) and Engineering Technician (EngTech) professional qualifications. Members who are Chartered Engineers can use the protected title Chartered Civil Engineer.

ICE is also licensed by the Society for the Environment to award the Chartered Environmentalist (CEnv) professional qualification.

Publishing

The Institution of Civil Engineers also publishes technical studies covering research and best practice in civil engineering. Under its commercial arm, Thomas Telford Ltd, it delivers training, recruitment, publishing and contract services, such as the NEC Engineering and Construction Contract. All the profits of Thomas Telford Ltd go back to the Institution to further its stated aim of putting civil engineers at the heart of society. The publishing division has existed since 1836 and is today called ICE Publishing.  ICE Publishing produces roughly 30 books a year, including the ICE Manuals series, and 30 civil engineering journals, including the ICE Proceedings in eighteen parts, Géotechnique, and the Magazine of Concrete Research.  The ICE Science series is now also published by ICE Publishing.  ICE Science currently consists of five journals: Nanomaterials and Energy, Emerging Materials Research, Bioinspired, Biomimetic and Nanobiomaterials, Green Materials and Surface Innovations.

ICE members, except for students, also receive the New Civil Engineer magazine (published weekly from 1995 to 2017 by Emap, now published monthly by Metropolis International).

Specialist Knowledge Societies
The ICE also administers 15 Specialist Knowledge Societies created at different times to support special interest groups within the civil engineering industry, some of which are British sections of international and/or European bodies. The societies provide continuing professional development and assist in the transfer of knowledge concerning specialist areas of engineering.

The Specialist Knowledge Societies are:

Governance
The institution is governed by the ICE Trustee Board, comprising the President, three Vice Presidents, four members elected from the membership, three ICE Council members, and one nominated member. The President is the public face of the institution and day-to-day management is the responsibility of the Director General.

President

The ICE President is elected annually and the holder for 2022–2023 is Keith Howells. 

Each year a number of young engineers have been chosen as President's apprentices. The scheme was started in 2005 during the Presidency of Gordon Masterton, who also initiated a President's blog, now the ICE Infrastructure blog. Each incoming President sets out the main theme of his or her year of office in a Presidential Address.

Many of the profession's greatest engineers have served as President of the ICE including:

One of Britain's greatest engineers, Isambard Kingdom Brunel died before he could take up the post (he was vice-president from 1850).

Female civil engineers
The first woman member of ICE was Dorothy Donaldson Buchanan in 1927. The first female Fellows elected were Molly Fergusson (1957), Marie Lindley (1972), Helen Stone (1991) and Joanna Kennedy (1992).

The two female Presidents (to date) are Jean Venables, who became the 144th holder of the office in 2008, and Rachel Skinner, who became President in November 2020.

In January 1969 the Council of the Institution set up a working party to consider the role of women in engineering. Among its conclusions were that 'while women have certainly established their competence throughout the professional engineering field, there is clearly a built-in or unconscious prejudice against them'. The WISE Campaign (Women into Science and Engineering) was launched in 1984; by 1992 3% of the total ICE membership of 79,000 was female, and only 0.8% of chartered civil engineers were women. By 2016 women comprised nearly 12% of total membership, almost 7% of chartered civil engineers and just over 2% of Fellows. In June 2015 a Presidential Commission on diversity was announced.

Awards

The Institution makes various awards to recognise the work of its members. In addition to awards for technical papers, reports and competition entries it awards medals for different achievements.
Gold Medal – The Gold Medal is awarded to an individual who has made valuable contributions to civil engineering over many years. This may cover contributions in one or more areas, such as, design, research, development, investigation, construction, management (including project management), education and training.
Garth Watson Medal – The Garth Watson Medal is awarded for dedicated and valuable service to ICE by an ICE Member or member of staff.
Brunel Medal – The Brunel Medal is awarded to teams, individuals or organisations operating within the built environment and recognises excellence in civil engineering.
Edmund Hambly Medal – The Edmund Hambly Medal awarded for creative design in an engineering project that makes a substantial contribution to sustainable development. It is awarded to projects, of any scale, which take into account such factors as full life-cycle effects, including de-commissioning, and show an understanding of the implications of infrastructure impact upon the environment.  The medal is awarded in honour of past president Edmund Hambly who was a proponent of sustainable engineering.
International Medal – The International Medal is awarded annually to a civil engineer who has made an outstanding contribution to civil engineering outside the United Kingdom or an engineer who resides outside the United Kingdom.
Warren Medal – The Warren Medal is awarded annually to an ICE member in recognition of valuable services to his or her region.
Telford Medal – Telford Medal is the highest prize that can be awarded by the ICE for a paper.
James Alfred Ewing Medal – The James Alfred Ewing Medal is awarded by the council on the joint nomination of the president and the President of the Royal Society.
James Forrest Medal – The James Forrest Medal was established in honour of James Forrest upon his retirement as secretary in 1896.
Jean Venables Medal – Since 2011, the Institution has awarded a Jean Venables Medal to its best Technician Professional Review candidate.
President's Medal
Emerging Engineer Award
James Rennie Medal – For the best Chartered Professional Review candidate of the year.  Named after James Rennie, a civil engineer noted for his devotion to the training of new engineers.
Renée Redfern Hunt Memorial Prize – For the best chartered or member professional review written exercise of the year.  Named for an ICE staff member who served as examinations officer from 1945 to 1981.
Tony Chapman Medal – For the best member professional review candidate of the year.  Named after an ICE council member who played a key role in the integration of the Board of Incorporated Engineers and Technicians into the institution and in promoting incorporated engineer status.
Chris Binnie Award for Sustainable Water Management
The Bev Waugh Award – Since 2021, for productivity and culture, recognises a leader or individual who has had a positive impact on joint team working
Adrian Long Medal

Student chapters

The ICE has student chapters in several countries including Hong Kong, India, Indonesia, Malaysia, Malta, Pakistan, Poland, Sudan, Trinidad, and United Arab Emirates.

Arms

See also
 Construction Industry Council

References

 Charles Matthew Norrie (1956). Bridging the Years – a short history of British Civil Engineering. Edward Arnold (Publishers) Ltd.
 Garth Watson (1988). The Civils – The story of the Institution of Civil Engineers. Thomas Telford Ltd
 Hugh Ferguson and Mike Chrimes (2011). The Civil Engineers – The story of the Institution of Civil Engineers and the People Who Made It. Thomas Telford Ltd

External links

Royal Charter and other documentation for governance of ICE 
ICE Royal Charter of June 1975, By-laws and Regulations, as at 16 May 2014
ICE Publishing website
ICE Science website

 
Civil engineering professional associations
ECUK Licensed Members
Organisations based in the City of Westminster
Organizations established in 1818
1818 establishments in the United Kingdom